Debesay is a surname. Notable people with the surname include:

 Ferekalsi Debesay (born 1986), Eritrean cyclist 
 Mekseb Debesay (born 1991), Eritrean cyclist, brother of Ferekalsi
 Yakob Debesay (born 1999), Eritrean cyclist